The surname Stelmach may refer to:

Andrzej Stelmach (born 1972), Polish former volleyball player and volleyball coach
Ed Stelmach (born 1951), Canadian politician
Kacper Stelmach (born 1997), Polish volleyball player, son of Andrzej
Krzysztof Stelmach (born 1967), Polish former volleyball player and volleyball coach, brother of Andrzej
Nahum Stelmach (1936–1999), Israeli footballer and manager